Ismaël is a given name or surname, and may refer to:

 Ismaël Aaneba (born 1999), French footballer 
 Ismaël Alassane (born 1984), Nigerian football defender
 Ismaël Ankobo (born 1997), Congolese footballer
 Ismaël Bako (born 1995), Belgian basketball player
 Ismaël Bamba (born 1987), Canadian football player
 Ismaël Bangoura (born 1985), Guinean footballer
 Ismaël Karba Bangoura (born 1994), Guinean footballer
 Ismaël Benahmed (born 1989), French footballer
 Ismaël Bennacer (born 1997), Algerian footballer 
 Ismaël Boura (born 2000), French footballer
 Ismaël Bouzid (born 1983), Algerian footballer
 Ismaël Bullialdus (1605–1695), French astronomer
 Ismaël Camara (born 2000), Guinean footballer
 Ismaël Coulibaly (born 1992), Ivorian taekwondo practitioner
 Ismaël Diallo (born 1997), Ivorian footballer
 Ismaël Diomandé (footballer, born 1992), Ivorian footballer
 Ismaël Diomandé (footballer, born 2003), Ivorian footballer
 Ismaël Doukouré (born 2003), French footballer
 Ismaël Emelien (born 1987), French political advisor 
 Ismaël Ferroukhi (born 1962), French-Moroccan film director
 Ismaël Béko Fofana (born 1988), Ivorian footballer
 Ismaël Gharbi (born 2004), Spanish footballer
 Ismaël Habib (born 1988), Canadian criminal, first person convicted of leaving the country to join a terrorist organization
 Ismaël Haddou (born 1996), Algerian footballer
 Ismaël Isaac (born 1966), Ivorian reggae musician
 Ismaël Kamagate (born 2001), French basketball player
 Ismaël Kanda (born 2000), French footballer
 Ismaël Kandouss (born 1997), Moroccan footballer
 Ismaël Keïta (born 1990), Malian footballer
 Ismaël Kip (born 1987), Dutch cyclist
 Ismaël Koné (born 2002), Canadian soccer player
 Ismaël Koudou (born 1975), Burkinabé footballer
 Ismaël de Lesseps (1871–1915), French fencer
 Ismaël Lô (born 1956), Senegalese musician
 Ismaël N'Diaye (born 1982), Ivorian basketball player
 Ismaël Ouedraogo (born 1991), Burkinabé footballer
 Ismael Sarmiento (born 1973), Colombian cyclist
 Ismaël Sow (born 2001), French footballer
 Ismaël Tidjani Serpos, Beninese politician
 Ismaël Touré (1925/26–1985), Guinean politician
 Ismaël Traoré (born 1986), Ivorian footballer
 Ismaël "Smahi" Triki (born 1967), Moroccan footballer
 Ismael Urzaiz (born 1971), Spanish footballer
 Ismaël Wagué, Malian military officer and political spokesperson
 Ismaël Zagrè (born 1992), Burkinabé footballer
 Ismaël, the stage name of Jean-Vital Jammes (1825–1893), French opera singer
 Valérien Ismaël (born 1975), French footballer

See also
 Hurricane Ismael (disambiguation)
 Ishmael (disambiguation)

Hebrew-language surnames
Hebrew-language given names